The Worcester Islamic Center (WIC), or the Worcester Mosque, is a mosque located in Worcester, Massachusetts.  The center started its operations in Oct 2005 (Ramadan 1426). There is also a Madrasah housed in the same building on the first floor. The website for the school is Alhuda Academy.

The center was built to replace the earlier mosque in the city, officially called ISGW (Islamic Society of Greater Worcester). The ISGW building was not adequate for the size of the congregation during the Friday and Eid prayers.

Imams
1998–2007: Imam Hafiz Shaikh Hamid
2007–2018: Imam Abdulkarim Hassan
2018–current: Imam Dr. Asif Hirani

See also
  List of mosques in the Americas
  Lists of mosques 
  List of mosques in the United States

External links

Mosques in Massachusetts
Mosques completed in 2005
Religious buildings and structures in Worcester, Massachusetts
2005 establishments in Massachusetts